Hakkunde is a 2017 Nigerian movie directed and written by Oluseyi Asurf.

Plot
A young man who graduated from the university is battling with self-identity and how he tries to surpass it and make a difference in his community and society.

Cast
 Frank Donga as Akande
 Toyin Aimakhu as Yewande
 Rahama Sadau as Aisha
 Maryam Booth as Binta
 Bukky Ajayi as Akande's mother
 Ibrahim Daddy as Ibrahim, Okada man

References

External links
 
 

Nigerian drama films
2017 films